Christopher Louis Fawcett (born 27 October 1954) is a former New Zealand rugby union player. A fullback and three-quarter, Fawcett represented Otago and Waikato at a provincial level, and was a member of the New Zealand national side, the All Blacks, on the 1976 tour to South Africa. He played 13 matches on that tour including two internationals.

References

1954 births
Living people
People from Matamata
People educated at St Paul's Collegiate School
New Zealand rugby union players
New Zealand international rugby union players
Otago rugby union players
Waikato rugby union players
Rugby union fullbacks
Rugby union centres
Rugby union players from Waikato